Óscar Moises Gamarra (born 13 August 1987) is a Paraguayan football midfielder who plays for Melgar. He was trialing with Australian club Newcastle Jets FC. He also played for the Peruvian teams Coronel Bolognesi and Real Garcilaso.

External links
 BDFA profile

Living people
1987 births
Paraguayan footballers
Association football midfielders
Real Garcilaso footballers
Coronel Bolognesi footballers
Expatriate footballers in Peru
Sportspeople from Asunción